Amstetten may refer to:
Amstetten (Württemberg), a municipality in the Alb-Donau district of Germany
Amstetten, Lower Austria, a municipality in southwest Lower Austria
Amstetten District, the district in Austria in which the prior municipality is located